Dumka railway station (station code DUMK) is a railway station serving the city of Dumka in Dumka district in the Indian state of Jharkhand on the Jasidih–Rampurhat section. It is in the Asansol division of the Eastern Railway zone of the Indian Railways.

History
Trains started from Dumka railway station when the 72 km track from Jasidih to Dumka became operational on 12 July 2011. The railway line was sanctioned in 1997–98 Railway Budget but the land acquisition work started after 2002 and major construction started after 2007. The first freight train came to Dumka on 12 December 2010. First intercity express between Dumka and Ranchi started on 24 September 2012. It runs every day.

Construction of the track from Dumka to Rampurhat was completed in early 2015 and became operational on 4 June 2015 when a passenger train operated from Dumka to Rampurhat. New train connections between West Bengal and Bihar via Dumka became feasible.

The 130 km railway line via Dumka reduced the distance between Jasidih and Rampurhat by 140 km from 270 km via Asansol.

A new railway line to connect Dumka to Bhagalpur directly was constructed. First, the metre-gauge railway track from Bhagalpur to Mandar Hill was converted to broad gauge. Then a new railway line from Mandar Hill to Hansdiha became operational on 23 December 2012. The further 30 km extension to Dumka became operational in 2015.

Facilities 
The major facilities available at Dumka station are waiting rooms, computerised reservation facility, drinking water, reservation counter and vehicle parking. The station also has toilets, refreshment room, a tea stall and a book stall.

Platforms
There are 3 platforms and 5 tracks. The platforms are connected by foot overbridge. These platforms are built to accumulate 24 coaches express trains. The platforms are equipped with modern facility like display board of arrival and departure of trains.

Dumka railway station has a separate platform for receiving and unloading freight (goods) trains.

Station layout

Trains 
Passenger train services exist from Dumka to Jasidih, Rampurhat, Bhagalpur and Godda. One intercity express train runs daily between Dumka and Ranchi. An express train Kaviguru Express runs between Howrah and Jamalpur via Dumka; its first run was on 10 November 2018.

Nearest airport
The nearest airports are Birsa Munda Airport at Ranchi, Gaya Airport, Lok Nayak Jayaprakash Airport at Patna and Netaji Subhas Chandra Bose International Airport at Kolkata.

Gallery

See also

References

External links 

 Dumka Station Junction Map
 Official website of the Dumka district

Railway stations in Dumka district
Asansol railway division
Railway stations in India opened in 2011